William Alphonsus "Wee Willie" Crilley (29 August 1901 – 16 September 1955) was a Scottish-American football forward who holds the record for the greatest number of goals scored by an Alloa Athletic player in a single season of the Scottish Football League. He had an itinerant career, spending most of it in the United States with a few seasons, or parts of seasons in Scotland.

Career
During his youth, Crilley played for Pale Ale, a local Glasgow amateur team. In 1920, he began the season with Cambuslang Rangers. During the season, he moved to Alloa Athletic of the Scottish Football League Second Division. In his first season with Alloa, he scored the game winners in Alloa's first and second round victories in the Scottish Cup. He also scored in the third round replay with Rangers F.C., a 4–1 loss for Alloa. Despite the loss in the Scottish Cup, Alloa won the 1921 Penman Trophy and Stirlingshire Cup. The next year, Crilley carried Alloa to the Second Division championship as he scored a record forty-nine goals, an amazing feat for a five-foot three center forward. Alloa transferred Crilley to Celtic at the end of the season, but he played only three first team games, scoring a single goal. Celtic sent him back to Alloa at the end of the season, but injuries hindered his playing time.

He then left Scotland to sign with New York Field Club in the American Soccer League which had not yet finished its season. He played five games, scoring five goals. Crilley began the 1923–1924 season in New York, played two league games, one National Challenge Cup game before being transferred to the New York Giants. He played two games, scoring one goal, then returned to Scotland to rejoin Alloa. According to the Alloa history, he was "transferred down south for £1,250" but it does not identify Crilley's new team. However, at some point he returned to the United States where he played eleven games of the 1924–1925 season with Indiana Flooring.

Crilley returned to the Giants for the 1925–1926 season, seeing his greatest number of games during any stint with a US team, twenty-eight. By this time, he was no longer a center forward and had become better known as a top winger and an excellent play maker. Crilley resumed his nomadic career during the 1926–1927 season, bouncing between three teams during the course of the season. He began with the Giants, played nine games for J&P Coats and finished with two games at Philadelphia Field Club. He then played for the New York Nationals in 1927–1928. In the 1928–1929 season, he was with Brooklyn Hispano, New York Hungaria and the IRT Rangers of the Eastern Professional Soccer League.

He apparently returned to Scotland intending to play for Alloa Athletic, but was deported from Scotland because he had become a US citizen. Therefore, he was back into the ASL in the fall of 1930 with the Newark Americans and the New York Soccer Club. While he played only one league game with New York SC, he saw another five cup games in which he scored seven goals. He continued his itinerant ways in 1931, playing for both the Fall River F.C. and the Brooklyn Wanderers before joining the New York American in the fall of 1931. Crilley replicated his early career goal scoring heroics for these last two teams, scoring 14 goals in 7 games for Brooklyn and 9 goals in 10 games for the Americans. In 1932, he attempted to rejoin Alloa Athletic, but was rebuffed. In 1935, he played for Brooklyn Hispano in the second American Soccer League.

He returned to the United States and joined the United States Army on 18 November 1942, serving in the Air Corps with Fifteenth Air Force during World War II.

References

1903 births
1955 deaths
Footballers from Glasgow
Scottish footballers
Scottish emigrants to the United States
American soccer players
American Soccer League (1921–1933) players
American Soccer League (1933–1983) players
Alloa Athletic F.C. players
Brooklyn Hispano players
Brooklyn Wanderers players
Celtic F.C. players
Eastern Professional Soccer League (1928–29) players
Fall River F.C. players
Indiana Flooring players
IRT Rangers players
J&P Coats players
New York Americans (soccer) (1930–1933) players
New York Hungaria players
New York Field Club players
New York Giants (soccer) players
New York Nationals (ASL) players
New York Soccer Club players
Newark Americans players
Philadelphia Field Club players
United States Army Air Forces personnel of World War II
Association football forwards
British emigrants to the United States
Cambuslang Rangers F.C. players
Scottish Junior Football Association players